Proverbs 16 is the sixteenth chapter of the Book of Proverbs in the Hebrew Bible or the Old Testament of the Christian Bible. The book is a compilation of several wisdom literature collections, with the heading in 1:1 may be intended to regard Solomon as the traditional author of the whole book, but the dates of the individual collections are difficult to determine, and the book probably obtained its final shape in the post-exilic period. This chapter is a part of the second collection of the book.

Text
The original text is written in Hebrew language. This chapter is divided into 33 verses.

Textual witnesses
Some early manuscripts containing the text of this chapter in Hebrew are of the Masoretic Text, which includes the Aleppo Codex (10th century), and Codex Leningradensis (1008).

There is also a translation into Koine Greek known as the Septuagint, made in the last few centuries BC. Extant ancient manuscripts of the Septuagint version include Codex Vaticanus (B; B; 4th century), Codex Sinaiticus (S; BHK: S; 4th century), and Codex Alexandrinus (A; A; 5th century).

Analysis
This chapter belongs to a section regarded as the second collection in the book of Proverbs (comprising Proverbs 10:1–22:16), also called "The First 'Solomonic' Collection" (the second one in Proverbs 25:1–29:27). The collection contains 375 sayings, each of which consists of two parallel phrases, except for Proverbs 19:7 which consists of three parts.

Verse 1
The saying in this verse states that a person may set things in order, plan out what one is going to say, but God can sovereignly enable to put one's thoughts into words. Together with verses 2–7 and 9, it form a small cluster of sayings dealing with divine providence over human affairs, contrasting sayings which commend 'careful planning as the key to successful undertakings' (cf. Proverbs 15:22; 20:18; 21:5), with the limitations that 'only plans coinciding with God's purposes will succeed' (verse 3; cf. Proverbs 19:21), thus 'man proposes, but God disposes' (verses 1, 9, cf. verse 33).

Verse 9A man’s heart plans his way,But the Lord directs his steps. 
"Heart": from the Hebrew word , lev, which can also mean “mind” representsing the faculty within a person most relevant to the verb for 'planning'.
This saying emphasizes the theme of 'man proposes, but God disposes' along with verses 1 and  33.

Verse 33The lot is cast into the lap,but the whole outcome is of the Lord.This saying concerns the practice of seeking divine leading through casting lots (cf. 1 Samuel 10), for examples, in the settlement of legal disputes (cf. 18:18), that 'however much a matter of chance the procedure may appear', God is 'the one who makes the decision' (literally, "judgement"), following the theme of 'man proposes, but God disposes' in verses 1 and  9.

Uses
Verse 25 is quoted in the chapter 26 of Didascalia Apostolorum'', an ancient Christian teaching book from 230 AD.

See also

Related Bible parts: Deuteronomy 12, Proverbs 7, Proverbs 15, Proverbs 22, Isaiah 34, Ezekiel 39

References

Sources

External links
 Jewish translations:
 Mishlei - Proverbs - Chapter 16 (Judaica Press) translation [with Rashi's commentary] at Chabad.org
 Christian translations:
 Online Bible at GospelHall.org (ESV, KJV, Darby, American Standard Version, Bible in Basic English)
 Book of Proverbs Chapter 16 King James Version
 Real Meaning of Proverbs 16:9
  Various versions

16